is a fictional character of the manga series Jujutsu Kaisen created by Gege Akutami. He is a first-year student at Tokyo Jujutsu High, an academy to become a Jujutsu sorcerer and develop cursed techniques to fight against cursed spirits, beings manifested from cursed energy due to negative emotions flowing from humans. He is a descendant to the Zenin family, one of the ultimate clans dominating the world of sorcery. Early in Jujutsu Kaisen, he is instructed by teacher Satoru Gojo to locate one of Sukuna's fingers, objects belonging to the most powerful cursed spirit of all time which leads to him partnering with and befriending Yuji Itadori, a fellow first-year Jujutsu sorcerer.

In the Jujutsu Kaisen anime adaptation, he is voiced by Yuma Uchida in Japanese and Robbie Daymond in English. Praise for the character was focused on his dynamic with Yuji and the animation of his fight scenes in the anime.

Concept and creation 
According to Akutami, Megumi was designed to be a foil to Itadori and Nobara Kugisaki. He was written to a more insightful character than either due to his greater acclivity towards negative thinking and lack of trust towards others. Akutami also stated that he is a more "rather depressing" character than Itadori, and that he was created to care less about strangers' fates like Itadori and more when animals die. Akutami was careful to make sure that Megumi's character design was differentiated from Itadori's, as they are largely familiar.

His first name, Megumi, is typically a female name meaning  "blessing" or "grace", used to represent Megumi as "strong" despite his "strange disposition" despite the fact that he largely goes by his last name. He was written to be a more gloomy contrast to other characters in the series, and his deranged laugh while fighting a finger-bearing curse was meant to exemplify his lack of outward joy. Japanese voice actor Yuma Uchida said Megumi was "oppressive but cool when he fights."

From American voice actor Robbie Daymond, "he is trying so hard to be the 'straight man' your interpretation of it is that it’s an act or a front. Yes, that’s who he is, but only a part of it. There is some other part of him that wants to come forward", adding that "when he does sort of get twisted up with Yuji and Gojo and they affect him emotionally, he expresses those things underneath a veneer of sullenness, and it’s a fun challenge." Daymond felt that "I still love those straight on the nose, heart on the sleeve shonen characters that I get to play; but I think the more complicated ones are more enjoyable in sessions."

Appearances 

Prior to the events of the present-day story, Megumi was born into the Zenin clan and left orphaned by his parents, to be looked after by his step-sister Tsumiki, who he sees as an inspiration. He was then tutored under Satoru Gojo in the first grade, as the sorcerer was left impressed by his immense power having also killed his father Toji years prior.

Megumi first appears in Jujutsu Kaisen alongside Yuji after he discovers Yuji has found one of Sukuna's fingers. After Yuji eats Sukuna's fingers, Yuji and Megumi become partners at Jujutsu High under the tutelage of Gojo. He is present when Nobara Kugisaki arrives in Tokyo, and strikes up a reluctant friendship with her and Yuji. During an altercation with a "curse womb" at a detention facility, Megumi witnesses Yuji seem to die after his heart is ripped out by Sukuna, who becomes interested in Megumi for his power and will while fighting Sukuna.

During an exchange event between the Tokyo and Kyoto jujutsu schools, Megumi is involved heavily in the fighting and is eventually taken out of the picture due to injuries sustained at the hands of the enemy cursed spirits. During a mission with Nobara and Yuji investigating "Cursed Womb": Death Paintings with curse and human blood, Megumi fights a cursed spirit bearing one of Sukuna's fingers and triumphs in the battle after giving into his emotions, falling asleep shortly afterwards.

He, along with many other jujutsu sorcerers, are sent to Shibuya when Mahito and the cursed spirits prepare to attack Japan. A curse user named Ogami summons Toji from the dead, while Megumi and Yuji defeat curse user Jiro Awasaka. He meets Toji, his father, after aiding him in defeat a powerful cursed spirit named Dagon, but does not realize who he is talking to before Toji commits suicide. During the battle, Sukuna saves him from Mahoraga, the most powerful shikigami. During the battle, Tsumiki, his sister, awakens from her coma that was inflicted by a cursed spirit and forced to participate in the Culling Game between the curse users of Japan.

He inadvertently becomes the head of the Zenin clan after the clan's previous head was killed in battle. Entering the game with Yuji, they are split up as soon as the game begins, fighting enemy curse users and forming alliances in order to win in the games and defeat Kenjaku, the powerful curse user who started the destruction.

Powers and abilities 
Megumi is proficient in hand-to-hand combat, defaulting to weaponry and Cursed Techniques in battle. His primary ability is the Ten Shadows Technique, inherited from the Zenin family, allowing him to summon friendly cursed spirits that will fight against anything considered a threat. His cursed spirit allies, called "shikigami", are a variety of animals used in fighting including Divine Dogs which have a heightened sense of smell attuned to curses, Nue (an electric bird-like creature), a Toad, a Max Elephant, and a Great Serpent. His Domain Expansion, a powerful technique creating an area around them amplifying a personalized curse technique, is called Chimera Shadow Garden, covering the ground in a shadowy liquid form allowing him to call up shikigami with ease and summon multiple at the same time, using their skills to overwhelm enemy attackers.

Reception 
Rebecca Silverman Anime News Network said Megumi was the least interesting protagonist from the manga's first chapters. Megumi's fight with the Special Grade Curse was listed as the third best anime fight from 2021 by Crunchyroll. In a review for episode 23 of the anime, “The Origin Of Blind Obedience Part 2”, Charles Hartford praised the depth and exploration of Megumi's character. He stated: "As he gets pushed to his limit, we see him dig deeper into his powers than has previously been shown" and that "the result of which is a display of power that serves to elevate Megumi in the pantheon of Jujutsu sorcerers and give MAPPA an excellent opportunity to work some of their trademark visual magic." Olive St. Sauver compared his and Yuji's friendship to Black Clover‘s Asta and Yuno because of how they "care for each other and are excited to see the other succeed...the desire to surpass the other comes from healthy competition rather than envy." David Eckstein-Schoemann of The Spinnaker, in a review for the anime, stated how he "[liked] seeing Yuuji work off of Megumi ...every character here has a distinct design, a distinct way of fighting, and a unique personality that leaves an impact whenever you see them." In May 2022, manga author Kenta Shinohara did his own tribute to the character of Megumi alongside Yuji and Yuta.

References 

Anime and manga characters who can move at superhuman speeds
Anime and manga characters who use magic
Anime and manga characters with superhuman strength
Comics characters introduced in 2018
Fictional Japanese people in anime and manga
Fictional characters who can manipulate darkness or shadows
Fictional characters with energy-manipulation abilities
Fictional characters with evocation or summoning abilities
Fictional demon hunters
Fictional exorcists
Fictional ghost hunters
Fictional male martial artists
Fictional polearm and spearfighters
Fictional stick-fighters
Fictional swordfighters in anime and manga
Male characters in anime and manga
Martial artist characters in anime and manga
Teenage characters in anime and manga